Buln Buln may refer to several places in Victoria, Australia:
Buln Buln, Victoria, a town in West Gippsland
Shire of Buln Buln, an administrative area in South Gippsland
County of Buln Buln, a cadastral division of South Gippsland